Ognes may refer to the following places in France:

 Ognes, Aisne, a commune in the department of Aisne
 Ognes, Marne, a commune in the department of Marne
 Ognes, Oise, a commune in the department of Oise